One More Tomorrow: The Best of Henry Gross is an album released by the American singer-songwriter Henry Gross. "One More Tomorrow" is a comprehensive overview of Gross' mid-'70s recordings, containing all of his hits for both A&M and Lifesong, including "Shannon" (his biggest hit), "Springtime Mama", "Someday (I Didn't Want To Have To Be The One)", and the title track.

Track listing
Tomorrow's Memory Lane
Come On Say It
Shannon
Painting My Love Song
Juke Box Song
Overton Square
Springtime Mama
One More Tomorrow
What a Sound
All My Love
Meet Me on the Corner
Moonshine Alley
Only the Beautiful
Hideaway
Love Is the Stuff
Simone
Someday
If We Tie Our Ships Together

References

External links
 One More Tomorrow

Pop albums by American artists
1996 greatest hits albums